Stanislav Lopachuk (born 16 February 1992) is a Belarusian ice hockey player for Yunost Minsk and the Belarusian national team.

He represented Belarus at the 2021 IIHF World Championship.

References

External links

1992 births
Living people
Belarusian expatriate ice hockey people
Belarusian expatriate sportspeople in Russia
Belarusian ice hockey centres
Belarusian ice hockey right wingers
Dizel Penza players
HC Dinamo Minsk draft picks
HC Neman Grodno players
Neftyanik Almetyevsk players
Ice hockey people from Minsk
Yunost Minsk players